Kichha is oldest tehseel of Udham Singh Nagar district. It is older than Rudrapur city. It has its own municipal board, located in Udham Singh Nagar district, Uttarakhand, India.

Geography
The town has an average elevation of 293  meters (953  feet).

Demographics

 India census, Kichha, a small but beautiful town previously was in Nainital district, had a population of 41,965. Males constitute 53% of the population and females 47%. Kichha has an average literacy rate of 76%, higher than the national average of 59.5%.  Male literacy is 83%, and female literacy is 59%. In Kichha, 12% of the population is under 6 years of age.

Hindus form 45% of the population of Kichha, while Muslims constitute 30% and but Sikh contribute 20% of the same rest 5% are tribes of Tharu and Buxa. Among the total Hindu population, Punjabis and Baniya people are prominent along with a small number of Sindhi and Bengali laborers. The Tharu Buxa tribe, who were once widespread in the region, is today confined to a few nearby villages. Bengalis are mostly migrants from Bangladesh during the war of 1971. 

Muslims mainly Arain or Maliks are dominating landowners in the nearby region of the Kichha and Rudrapur. They are Punjabi Muslims who migrated from Sirsa, then Punjab, now Haryana during the Chalisa famine to settle in Tarai region of Nainital i.e. Kichha, Bareilly, Pilibheet in the year 1783. They started cultivating the jungles of the area from the 18th century on wards.  They are mostly in the Kichha, Sirauli, Sisayi, Kishanpur, Bandia, Naugwan, Malpura, Kacchi Khamaria, Bhamraula, Bari, Bara and in various parts of Sitarganj town. Syeds, Khans' Ansaris, Saifis, Qureshis, Salmanis constitutes rest of the Muslim population.
Major population of Kichha town has increased after both Hindus and Muslims migrated from Uttar Pradesh after the formation of SIDCUL in Rudrapur.

Economy
Kichha has largely an agriculture-based economy. Paddy, wheat and sugarcane are the major crops here. Most of the farmers are rich and affluent due to the availability of rich arable land and their sheer hard work. There are some 30+ rice mills in its vicinity. After the establishment of SIDCUL, the economy has developed a lot.

Educational Institutes
Gurukul School:The Temple Of learning
G. B. Pant University of Agriculture and Technology
Surajmal university kichha
Janta Inter College Govt. Boys
Govt.Girls Inter College
Surajmal Degree College (Private)
Kisan Kanya Mahavidyalaya Govt.
Little Angle School Private
St. Peter School
Maulana Azad Public School
Himalayan Progressive School
Nalanda Residential School

Notable Personalities from Kichha 
Politicians
Tilak Raj Behar MLA
Mr. Darshan Kumar Koli Chairman
Rajkumar Bajaj President Vyapar Mandal
Admin
Kostubh Mishra, SDM
Kamlendra Semwal Chairman Mandi Samiti
Art/Literature/Academic/Professional
Nasir Subhani Poet
Dr.Shahnawaz Ahmed Malik Warsi (Academician)
Sanjay k Chadha Advocate (Supreme court of India)
Miswauddin Malik Social worker

References

Cities and towns in Udham Singh Nagar district